Club Deportivo Roces, also known as TSK Roces by sponsorship reasons, is a Spanish football club based in the neighbourhood of Roces, Gijón in the autonomous community of Asturias.

History
Founded in 1952, CD Roces is one of the most important farm teams in Asturias, and its under-18 team played in the División de Honor several seasons. The senior team was re-opened in 2004 after several years without competing. Ten years later, Roces promoted to Tercera División for the first time in its history.

Season to season

3 seasons in Tercera División
1 season in Tercera División RFEF

Notable players
 Juanele

In youth teams
 José Ángel
 José Aurelio

References

External links
Official website 

Football clubs in Asturias
Sport in Gijón
Association football clubs established in 1952
1952 establishments in Spain